The following lists events that happened during 1873 in South Africa.

Incumbents
 Governor of the Cape of Good Hope and High Commissioner for Southern Africa: Sir Henry Barkly.
 Lieutenant-governor of the Colony of Natal:
 Sir Anthony Musgrave (until 29 April).
 Thomas Milles (acting from 30 April to 21 July).
 Sir Benjamin Pine (from 22 July).
 State President of the Orange Free State: Jan Brand.
 State President of the South African Republic: Thomas François Burgers.
 Lieutenant-Governor of Griqualand West: Sir Richard Southey (from 17 July).
 Prime Minister of the Cape of Good Hope: Sir John Molteno.

Events
April
 30 – Thomas Milles becomes acting Lieutenant-governor of the Colony of Natal.

May
 1 – The use of Dutch is officially allowed in the Cape of Good Hope's parliament.
 14 – The Ohrigstad area is proclaimed a public gold field after gold is discovered in the Selati River.

July
 5 – New Rush in Griqualand West is renamed Kimberley after John Wodehouse, 1st Earl of Kimberley.
 17 – Sir Richard Southey becomes the first Lieutenant-Governor of Griqualand West.
 22 – Sir Benjamin Pine becomes Lieutenant-governor of the Colony of Natal.

August
 20 – Prime Minister John Molteno authorises construction of the new Cape Eastern railway line from East London.

December
 4 – , on its worldwide marine research expedition, is officially welcomed in Cape Town.
 26 – HMS Challenger arrives at Prince Edward Islands and contacts survey and charts the islands

Unknown date
 The University of South Africa is founded in Cape Town as the University of the Cape of Good Hope.
 The Cape Government establishes the first district boarding schools to educate children from rural areas while education is standardised at the Cape.
 The town of East London is officially established through the proclaimed merger of the three settlements of Panmure, East London and East London East.
 Warmbad is established as Hartingsburg at the hot springs north of Pretoria.

Births
 13 August – C.J. Langenhoven, playwright, poet, journalist, politician and author of Die Stem van Suid-Afrika. (d. 1932)
 20 August – William Henry Bell, musician, composer and first director of the South African College of Music. (d. 1946)

Deaths
 1 May – David Livingstone is found dead on his knees beside his bed at Lake Bangweolo. (b. 1813)

Railways

Railway lines opened
 Namaqualand – Muishondfontein to Kookfontein, .

Locomotives
 Two Cape gauge 0-4-0 saddle tank locomotives enter service at Port Elizabeth on the Midland System of the Cape Government Railways. They are the first Cape gauge locomotives to enter service in South Africa.
 East London's first steam locomotive is landed at East London Harbour, a  Brunel gauge 0-4-0 vertical boiler engine acquired for work on breakwater construction.

References

South Africa
Years in South Africa
History of South Africa